Ratan Kumar Bhowmik is an Indian politician and a member of the Communist Party of India (Marxist). He is a member of the Tripura Legislative Assembly from the Kakraban-Salgarh constituency in Gomati district.

References

Communist Party of India (Marxist) politicians from Tripura
Tripura politicians
Tripura MLAs 2018–2023
Year of birth missing (living people)
Living people